The 1895 Buchtel football team represented Buchtel College in the 1895 college football season. The team did not have a coach; their captain was Frank Rockwell.

Schedule

References

Buchtel
Akron Zips football seasons
Buchtel football